Sitel 3 is a satellite television channel in North Macedonia. Its sister channels are Sitel and Sitel 2.

Lineup
Jadi Burek

FIBA EuroBasket

FIBA Basketball World Cup

External links
Skopje

References

Television channels in North Macedonia